Ben Lyons (born October 8, 1981) is an American entertainment reporter and sportscaster. He is the co-host of Bonjour Sports Talk on Amazon Prime Video Sports Talk.

Early life
Lyons is the son of entertainment reporter Jeffrey Lyons and the grandson of the American newspaper columnist Leonard Lyons.

Career
Lyons started his own production company in 2002 and produced segments for the TV show, Hip-Hop Nation. In 2004, MTV hired him to co-host Your Movie Show. In 2006, Lyons hosted entertainment segments on The Daily 10. In addition, he began to write a column for E! Online called "The Lyons Den".  Lyons hosted My Family's Got GUTS, on Nickelodeon and has appeared in Disaster Movie and The House Bunny. He is a regular contributor to Good Morning America. In 2012, Lyons left E! and became a correspondent on Extra.  Lyons also joined ESPN as a commentator in 2012.

In September 2008, Lyons became a co-host of the TV show,  At the Movies. Critics said Lyons lacked a proper understanding of film history, used language that sounded like movie advertising (in order to promote his own profile), and had a conflict of interest with some actors whose movies he reviewed. Roger Ebert gave implied criticism of Lyons in his online blog. Lyons and his co-host, Ben Mankiewicz, were fired from the program less than a year later, in August 2009.

Lyons also hosts a podcast of The Players' Tribune. Lyons is ESPN Sports Commentator. Lyons was named Fathom Events host in April 2016.

In 2022, Embassy Row announced that Lyons will co-host Bonjour Sports Talk with Madelyn Burke on Amazon Prime Video. On November 14, 2022, Lyons made his debut with co-host Madelyn Burke on Bonjour Sports Talk.

Filmography

Film

Television

Accolades
Lyons was inducted into the Southern California Sports Hall of Fame in 2020.

References

External links
 
 LAist.com Interview with Ben Lyons

1981 births
Living people
American film critics
Jewish American journalists
Journalists from New York City
21st-century American Jews